Zbyněk Berka of Dubá (1551 – 6 March 1606) was a Catholic cleric, cardinal and the tenth Archbishop of Prague. He was member of the Berka of Dubá family. He was grand master of the religious order of Knights of the Cross with the Red Star.

Biography
Zbyněk Berka of Dubá was born in Dřevěnice in 1551, the son of Zdeněk Berka of Dubá and his wife Katharina Haugwitz. Being born into the House of Berka of Dubá, he was a member of the Bohemian nobility.

He was educated with the Jesuits at Prague and Olomouc. He then attended the University of Kraków, where he received a licentiate in theology. Next, he studied at the University of Ingolstadt, receiving a doctorate in theology.

He was ordained as a priest in Prague in 1574. Shortly thereafter, he became a canon of Salzburg Cathedral, St. Vitus Cathedral, Stará Boleslav Cathedral, Olomouc Cathedral, Litoměřice Cathedral, Regensburg Cathedral, and Oetting Cathedral. In 1574, he became provost of the Basilica of St. Peter and St. Paul, and later became provost of Saint Wenceslas Cathedral (1577), Oetting Cathedral (1581), Regensburg Cathedral (1582), and Litoměřice (1587).

In 1578, Pope Gregory XIII named him chamberlain to the pope and a protonotary apostolic. He served as the Apostolic Administrator of the Diocese of Regensburg from 1582 to 1587. He became grand master of the Knights of the Cross with the Red Star in 1590, holding this position until his death.

The cathedral chapter of St. Vitus Cathedral elected Berka of Dubá to be Archbishop of Prague on 21 June 1593. On 10 October 1593, he was consecrated as a bishop by Cesare Speciano, Bishop of Cremona.

On 15 June 1603, Rudolf II, Holy Roman Emperor granted him the title of prince of the Holy Roman Empire.

In 1606, Pope Paul V announced his intention to make Berka of Dubá a cardinal, but Berka of Dubá died before his elevation could take place. He died in Prague on 6 March 1606, and is buried in St. Vitus Cathedral.

References

Czech cardinals
Roman Catholic archbishops of Prague
1551 births
1606 deaths
People from Jičín District
Bohemian nobility
17th-century cardinals
17th-century Roman Catholic archbishops in the Holy Roman Empire